The Battle of Ozawahara was fought in 1530 in the present day Asao, Kawasaki, Kanagawa. 
This was the first battle for Hōjō Ujiyasu, then sixteen years old.

Ujiyasu faced Uesugi Tomooki at Ozawahara in Musashi Province. The battle was part of a seventeen-year struggle between the Hōjō clan and the Uesugi clan for control of the Kantō region which began with the 1524 Siege of Edo. The battle ended with a Hōjō victory.

References

Turnbull, Stephen (1998). 'The Samurai Sourcebook'. London: Cassell & Co.

Ozawahara
1530 in Japan
Ozawahara